Sagaptham is a 2015 Indian Tamil-language action comedy film directed by Surendran and produced by L. K. Sudhish. The film stars newcomer Shanmuga Pandian, with Neha Hinge and Shubra Aiyappa. The film shows a village youth who travels to Malaysia to find work. In a turn of events, he becomes a detective there and tracks down a gang that produces illegal medicines.

Soundtrack was composed by Karthik Raja. Naveen Krishna and Velumani has written the story and dialogues respectively. The cinematography was performed by S. K. Bhupathi and S. P. Ahmed worked as an editor.

Cast

Shanmuga Pandian as Saga
Neha Hinge as Neha
Vijayakanth as Indian Embassy Officer Deiveegam (guest appearance)
Suresh as Doctor 
Shubra Aiyappa as Priya
Ranjith as Chinrasu
Devayani as Lakshmi
Jagan as Maruthu, Saga's friend
Rajendranath as Saga's father
Powerstar Srinivasan as R. Manmadhan, Saga's uncle
Singampuli as Tiger
Shanmugarajan as Neha's father
Rekha Suresh as Neha's mother
Thalaivasal Vijay as Dinesh
Bose Venkat as Cruel Moneylender
Prema Priya as Guruvamma
Saurav Chakrabarti
Muthukaalai

Production
In June 2011, actor Vijayakanth revealed that his youngest son Shanmugapandian would be introduced as an actor in the Tamil film industry and began looking for apt scripts for his debut venture. Shanmugapandian, then a Visual Communications student at Loyola College, Chennai, began taking dance lessons and martial arts practice, to get into better physical shape before his first film. Vijayakanth initially considered remaking the Telugu film, Brindavanam (2010) as well other projects directed by K. S. Ravikumar and Hari, but later opted for an original script written by Naveen, with dialogues by Velumani. By the end of 2012, it was finalised that Vijayakanth's brother-in-law L. K. Sudhish would be the film's producer and newcomer Santhoshkumar Rajan, would be director. The film was launched on 12 December 2013 at Aandal Azhagar Illam in Saligramam, Chennai with several of Vijayakanth's contemporaries in attendance. Early reports speculated that actor Vijay and Vijayakanth himself, would play guest roles, but speculation was denied.

The film began its first schedule in and around Pollachi, Azhiyar Dam, Valparai and Anaimalai for close to a month. The second schedule of the film's shoot was held in Kumbakonam for three weeks during when a song involving 1000 junior artistes and 200 dancers was shot for 6 days. However, during production in September 2014, Santhoshkumar Rajan left the project after falling out with the producers, complaining that there was too much interference in the scripting and film-making process. Reports suggested that Vijayakanth would take over as director, though eventually another debutant Surendran, was handed the opportunity. In November 2014, it was revealed that the film's shoot was progressing in Malaysia with two former beauty pageant contestants making their film debuts as the lead actresses. Reports suggested Neha Kapur and Shubra Aiyappa were cast as heroines, while it was later clarified that Neha Hinge and not Kapur was chosen. The team later moved to film action scenes in Thailand, with Kecha Khamphakdee signed up as the stunt choreographer.

Soundtrack

The soundtrack is composed by Karthik Raja. In 8 December 2014, Silambarasan, Andrea Jeremiah and Remya Nambeesan recorded a song for the film, which had lyrics written by Parthy Bhaskar.

Release
The satellite rights of the film were sold to Captain TV

Reception
The Hindu gave the film a negative review for the film stating the appearance of Vijayakanth made the movie "a bit more tolerable".

References

External links
 

2015 films
2010s Tamil-language films
2015 masala films
Indian action films
Films shot in Malaysia
Films shot in Thailand
2015 directorial debut films
Films scored by Karthik Raja
2015 action films